Timothy John March Phillipps de Lisle (born 25 June 1962) is a British writer and editor who is a feature writer for The Guardian and other publications, focusing on cricket and rock music.

Early life and education
De Lisle is the second son of stockbroker Major Everard John Robert March Phillipps de Lisle (1930–2003), of the Royal Horse Guards, Adjutant of the Household Cavalry Regiment from 1955 to 1958, High Sheriff of Leicestershire in 1974, and Vice-Lord Lieutenant of Leicestershire from 1990 to 2003, and his wife Hon. Mary Rose, daughter of Conservative politician Osbert Peake, 1st Viscount Ingleby, His paternal grandfather was the cricketer, soldier and High Sheriff of Leicestershire John de Lisle, of Stockerston Hall, Rutland, who was of a prominent family of Leicestershire landed gentry that owned Grace Dieu Manor and Quenby Hall. de Lisle was educated at Eton and Worcester College, Oxford.

Career
De Lisle is a feature writer for The Guardian, focusing on cricket and rock music. He is the editor of the magazine Intelligent Life, is the rock critic at The Mail on Sunday and also edited the Wisden Cricketers' Almanack in 2003.

Personal life
De Lisle married in 1991, and has two children.

References

External links
Official website

1962 births
Living people
Cricket historians and writers
People educated at Eton College
Alumni of Worcester College, Oxford
British sportswriters
Editors of Wisden Cricketers' Almanack
English magazine editors